is a Japanese artist. She lives and works in Bologna, Italy, and Kawanishi, Japan.

Early life and education
Karasumaru was born in Osaka, Japan. She lives and works in Bologna, Italy and Kawanishi, Japan. She graduated from the sculpture department of Kyoto City University of Arts and from the Italian National Academy of Fine Arts (Bologna) painting course.

Selected solo exhibitions

2018 "Facing Histories ", Galleria I VOLPINI, Bologna, Italy
2016 "Facing Histories", Bologna Museum of Modern Art (MAMbo),Bologna, Italy
2015 "Facing Histories", Roppongi Hills A/D gallery, Tokyo, Japan
"Facing Histories", @Kcua Kyoto City University Arts Art Gallery, Kyoto Japan
"Facing Histories in Hiroshima", Prefectural Gallery, Hiroshima Prefectural Art Museum, Hiroshima,Japan
2014 "Spriti evanescenti - Dal Giappone al Marfisa d'Este", Palazzina di Marfisa d'Este, Ferrara, Italy 
"Facing Histories", Galerie Houg, Lyon, France
2013 "Tokyo – Monogatari", Studio Carlotta Pesce, Bologna, Italy
2011 "Tokyo Stories – Vol. 3", Galerie Houg, Lyon, France
2010 "It's Our Tokyo Stories", Mizuma Action (Mizuma Art Gallery), Tokyo, Japan
2009 "Tokyo Stories",fabioparisartgallery, Brescia, Italy
2006 "Bunshin – Everyday Life", Mizuma Action (Mizuma Art Gallery), Tokyo, Japan
2005 "Tokyo AGERS", fabioparisartgallery, Brescia, Italy
2004 "Facing Histories",Teatro Nuovo Giovanni da Udine, Udine, Italy
2002 "Facing Histories",Marcel Scheiner Gallery, Hilton Head Island, United States 
1999 "Hino Izuru Kuni Yori", Galleria Luigi Franco Arte Contemporanea, Turin, Italy
"Toki No Fuin", Prefectural Gallery, Hiroshima Prefectural Art Museum, Hiroshima, Japan
"Modern Crimes", Viafarini, Milan, Italy
1998 "Spazioaperto", Galleria d'Arte Moderna Bologna, Bologna, Italy
1996 "Toki No Fuin", Art Forum Gallery, Merano, Italy
1995 "Banzai", Galleria Guido Carbone, Turin, Italy

Selected group exhibitions
2019 "Turn over #1", Galleria Paola Verrengia, Salerno, Italy
2018 "Lari- gli spiriti protettori della casa", Triennale di Milano, Superstudio, Milan, Italy
"EX-NOVO", Fondazione Plart, Naples, Italy
2017 "Roberto Daolio – vita e incontri un criticod’arte attraverso le opere di una collezione non intenzionale"
Museo d’Arte Moderna di Bologna (MAMbo), Bologna, Italy
2016 "Tam Tam: Normali Meraviglie, la Mano", Triennale di Milano
"La Casa do ut do – Art for Hospice – i valori dell’abitare", Pinacoteca Nazionale di Bologna, Bologna, Italy
2015 "Silent @Kcua" – @Kcua Kyoto City University Arts Art Gallery, Kyoto, Japan
2014 "Shown Or To Be Shown", Galerie Houg, Lyon France
2012 "Do ut do – Art for Hospice", Spazio Carbonesi, Bologna, Italy 
2009 "Run, Jump and Throw – Athletics in international Contemporary Art", the Berlin City Hall, Berlin, Germany　
"Second Skin"　Spazio Paraggi, Treviso, Italy
2007 "Red Hot – Asian Art Today from the Chaney Family Collection", The Museum of Fine Arts, Houston, U.S.A.
2006 "La Donna Oggetto – Miti e metamorfosi al femminile 1900-2005", Castello di Vigevano, Vigevano, Italy
2005 "Chronos – il tempo nell'arte dall'epoca barocca all'eta contemporanea", Il Filatoio, Caraglio, Italy
"Altre Lilith – Le Vestali dell’Arte – Terzo Millennio"Scuderie Aldobrandini per l’Arte, Frascati, Italy
"Bologna COntemporanea", Galleria d'Arte Moderna di Bologna, Bologna, Italy
"XIV Quadriennale di Roma", Galleria Nazionale d'Arte Moderna di Roma, Rome, Italy
2004 "Far East – Volume 1, Yu Hirai + Yumi Karasumaru", Agenzia04, Bologna, Italy 
"Comunita – Community", Premio Internazionale d'Arte "Ermanno Casoli settima edizione" Cartoteca Storica Regionale ,Serra San Quirico, Italy
"Female Dignity – Inszenierung der Weiblichkeit in der modernen Kunst", Schloss Ulmerfeld, Ulmerfeld, Austria
"Officina Asia", Galleria d'arte Ex-Pescheria, Cesena, Italy
2003 "Muta. Menti & Mut. Azioni", D406 Galleria d'arte contemporanea, Modena, Italy
2002 "Small Works", Marcel Scheiner Gallery, Hilton Head Island, U.S.A.
"Lavori Domestici", Via Magenta,14, Varese, Italy
"Mountain Way – I sentieri dell'arte per la montagna", Palazzo Frisacco, Tolmezzo
2001 "Tutto l'odio del Mondo", Palazzo dell' Arengario, Milan
"Auguri d'Artista 2001", Mart Palazzo delle Albere, Trento, Italy
"Groupshow", Marcel Scheiner Gallery, Hilton Head Island, U.S.A. 
"Figure del Novecento 2. Oltre l'Accademia", Accademia di Belle Arti di Bologna, Bologna, Italy
"My Opinion", Palazzo Lanfranchi, Pisa, Italy
2000 "Insights", Fondazione Adriano Olivetti, Rome, Italy

Selected performances
2020 "The Story-teller, il narratore 2020 – Il nome di quell’uomo è Pasquale " , at Galleria de Foscherari, Bologna, Italy 
2019 "The Bumper Car Kodanshi - Circolare", at the amusement park, Baggio, Milano, Italy
 "The Story-teller, Kataribe 2019 – Make yourself at home", from 1st to 3rd of February, at artist’s home studio,in the program of ART CITY – Arte Fiera 2019, Bologna, Italy
2018 "The Story-teller, Il narratore 2018 – The Four Pop Songs" at I VOLPINI for ArtCity Bologna, 31 January, Bologna, Italy
2017 "Facing Histories in Hiroshima- versione speciale per Torino 2017", Museo Ettore Fico, 4thof November, Turin, Italy
 "Story-teller, il narratore-special version for Naples 2017" ,at Palazzo Caracciolo di San Teodoro in Naples, 15 June, Naples,Italy
2016 "Facing Histories in Hiroshima", Museo d’Arte Moderna di Bologna(MAMbo), 6 August, Bologna , Italy
2015 "Facing Histories in Hiroshima", @Kcua Kyoto City University Arts Art Gallery, 6, 9 August, Kyoto Japan
"Facing Histories in Hiroshima", at Ateliersi, Bologna, Italy
2014 "Korosù-to Kill – Special version for, Marfisa 2014", at Palazzina Marfisa d'Este in Ferrara, Italy 
"The Story-Teller, Kataribe 2014", at Galerie Houg, Lyon, France
2013 "The Story-Teller, il narratore", at Studio Carlotta Pesce, Bologna, Italy 
"The Story-Teller, il narratore", "KOROSù-to Kill" at Ex-chiesa di San Mattia, Bologna ( the event of Arte Fiera – ArtcCity Bologna)
2011 "The Story-Teller", at Gallerie Houg, Lyon, France
2010 "The Story-Teller", at Mizuma Action (Mizuma Art Gallery), Tokyo
2009 "The Story-Teller", at Coin department store, Treviso 
"The Story-Teller", at fabioparisartgallery, Brescia
2006 "Koros-Aikiru (I Kill)", at Mizuma Action (Mizuma Art Gallery), Tokyo
2002 "Facing Histories", Marcel Scheiner Gallery, Hilton Head Island, USA
2001 "Kataribe – the narater" ( Domestic Art ), at Dt. G. Masini & Dr. M. Paoletti, 16 September, Pisa
2000 "Insights – glimpses and actions between public and private spaces", Fondazione Adriano Olivetti, Rome 
"Bunshin", Galleria Civicadi Arte Contemporanea Trento, Trento
"Serata Fluxus", Chiostri di S. Domenico - ex Stalloni, Reggio Emilia
1999 "Bunshin", Galleria Luigi Franco Arte Contemporanea, Turin
"Domestic Art on Tour", at Dr. M. De Michelis & Dr.A Kohlmayer, 18 May, Venice
"Domestic Art on Tour", at Dr. Gemma De Angelis Testa, 2Oth of April, Turin
"Domestic Art on Tour", at Dr. Ruben Levi, 24 February, Turin
"Domestic Art on Tour", at Dr. Claudio Guenzani, 11 February, Milan
1998 "Domestic Art on Tour", at Dr. Patrizia Brusarosco (Via Farini), 16 December, Milan
"Short Story of Japan", Sancarlino Theater – Brescia Music Art Festival – Brescia
Television program "Le Notti dell'Angelo", Italia 1

Books
2016 "Korosu – Io Uccido – コロス- I Kill" Kappa Edizioni
2015 "Facing Histories – フェーシング・ヒストリーズ　烏丸由美　"Pubblicato da Facing Histories Committee

References

External links 
 
 YouTube Yumi karasumaru Official YouTube Channel
 Facebook Yumi Karasumaru Art Page

1958 births
Living people
Japanese artists